Gunnar Ernst Ferdinand Johansson (21 June 1924 – 14 March 1997) was a Swedish diver. He competed in the men's 3 metre springboard event at the 1952 Summer Olympics.

References

External links
 

1924 births
1997 deaths
Swedish male divers
Olympic divers of Sweden
Divers at the 1952 Summer Olympics
Divers from Stockholm
20th-century Swedish people